was a Japanese actress, voice actress and narrator.

Career
Fuyumi was previously affiliated with Aoni Production and after she left Aoni and joined Ken Production founded by the late Kenji Utsumi until the time of her death.

Death
Shiraishi died on March 26, 2019, of ischemic heart failure at her Setagaya home at the age of 82.

Filmography

Television animation
Big X (1964) (Nina Belton)
Wonder Three (1965) (Bokko)
Osomatsu-kun (1966) (Karamatsu)
Sally, the Witch (1966) (Poron)
Perman (1967) (Perman #5/Pābō)
Cyborg 009 (1968) (Ivan Whiskey/001)
Kaibutsu-kun (1968) (Tarou Kaibutsu)
Kyojin no Hoshi (1968)  and Shin Kyojin no Hoshi (1977) (Akiko Hoshi)
Ashita no Joe (1970) (Sachi)
Ultraman Leo (1974) (Taishoh)
Mobile Suit Gundam (1979-1980) (Mirai Yashima, Katz Kobayashi)
Hana no Ko Lunlun (1979) (Katy)
Space Runaway Ideon (1980-1981) (Kasha Imhof)
Maeterlinck's Blue Bird: Tyltyl and Mytyl's Adventurous Journey (1980) (Shanet the cat)
Ashita no Joe 2 (1980) (Sachi)
Honey Honey no Suteki na Bouken (1981-1982) (Princess Flora)
Boku Patalliro! (1982) (Patalliro)
Eagle Sam (1983-1984) (Guzuran)
Mobile Suit Zeta Gundam (1985) (Mirai Noa)
Obake no Q-Taro (1985) (Doronpa)
Dororonpa! (1991) (Komachi Ono)
Ojarumaru (1998) (Hanajitsu)
Nichijou (2011) (Ball of mud / Steel ball)
Space Dandy (2014) (Yoko)

Original video animation (OVA)
Giant Robo (1992) (Sanny the Magician)

Theatrical animation
Mobile Suit Gundam: Char's Counterattack (1988) (Mirai Yashima)

Video games
Tengai Makyō II: Manjimaru (1992) (Omil)
Panic! (1993) (Slap)

Awards

References

External links
Official agency profile 

1936 births
2019 deaths
Actresses from Beijing
Japanese Christians
Japanese expatriates in China
Japanese video game actresses
Japanese voice actresses
People from Shizuoka (city)
Voice actresses from Shizuoka Prefecture
Aoni Production voice actors
Ken Production voice actors